Diathrausta leucographa is a moth in the family Crambidae. It was described by George Hampson in 1917. It is found in New Guinea, where it has been recorded from the D'Entrecasteaux Islands (Goodenough Island).

References

Moths described in 1917
Spilomelinae